The Anti-Life Equation is a fictional concept appearing in American comic books published by DC Comics. In Jack Kirby's Fourth World setting, the Anti-Life Equation is a formula for total control over the minds of sentient beings that is sought by Darkseid, who, for this reason, sends his forces to Earth, as he believes part of the equation exists in the subconsciousness of humanity. Various comics have defined the equation in different ways, but a common interpretation is that the equation is a mathematical proof of the futility of living.

History
Jack Kirby's original comics established the Anti-Life Equation as giving the being who learns it power to dominate the will of all sentient and sapient races. It is called the Anti-Life Equation because "if someone possesses absolute control over you — you're not really alive". Most stories featuring the Equation use this concept. The Forever People's Mother Box found the Anti-Life Equation in Sonny Sumo, but Darkseid, unaware of this, stranded him in ancient Japan. A man known as Billion-Dollar Bates had control over the Equation's power even without the Mother Box's aid, but was accidentally killed by one of his own guards.

When Metron and Swamp Thing attempt to breach the Source, which drives Swamp Thing temporarily mad, Darkseid discovers that part of the formula is love. Upon being told by the Dominators of their planned invasion of Earth, Darkseid promises not to interfere on the condition that the planet is not destroyed so his quest for the equation is not thwarted.

It is later revealed in Martian Manhunter (vol. 2) #33 that Darkseid first became aware of the equation approximately 300 years ago when he made contact with the people of Mars. Upon learning of the Martian philosophy that free will and spiritual purpose could be defined by a Life Equation, Darkseid postulated that there must exist a negative equivalent.

In Walt Simonson's Orion (2001), Darkseid and Desaad have gained the Equation from clones of Billion Dollar Bates. In stopping them Orion learned the Equation, and tried to use it to make people happy and good, but decided that the suppression of free will is always a bad thing. Mister Miracle knows the formula, but is one of the few with the willpower not to use it.  During the series Young Justice, it was stated that the mystical heroine Empress holds within her a piece of an Anti-Life Equation, which allows her to control the minds of others to limited extents. Countdown to Final Crisis #10 reveals that the Pied Piper also contained the equation within his mind and can manifest it through music. Desaad attempts to use Piper as his pawn to help him destroy Brother Eye and Darkseid so that he could rule Apokolips.

During the Final Crisis, Darkseid's plan comes to fruition even without Pied Piper's help. In fact, using the "spoken form" of the Anti-Life, Darkseid (reborn after his death as "Boss Dark Side" on Earth) is able to rebuild a strong power base on Earth by having Mokkari unleash the Anti-Life Equation through the internet by email, turning those exposed to it into his mindless slaves. Libra used the Anti-Life Equation to turn several members of his Secret Society of Super Villains into Justifiers while some of Earth's superheroines and supervillainesses were converted into new versions of the Female Furies.

It was revealed that the Equation can be countered by drawing the New Genesis word for "freedom" on one's face. Also, Doctor Sivana invented a device that allowed Lex Luthor to wrest control of the Equation-controlled Justifiers from Libra and Darkseid. In Terror Titans #4, because of the brain's status as an electromagnetic organ, Static is immune to the Equation's effects. In Final Crisis #7, Wonder Woman breaks the Equation's hold over the people of Earth by binding Darkseid's body with the Lasso of Truth.

After Darkseid's disappearance, the Calculator tasks himself with the role of tracking down the fragments of the Equation left in the internet, which had taken the appearance of floating diamonds in Alta Viva, an in-universe multi-player online game similar to Second Life. By having real diamonds cut in the shape of the virtual ones, the Calculator hopes to harness and restore its power for himself.

The Multiversity features a different version to the Anti-Life Equation known as the Anti-Death Equation: a dark, mysterious power used by the Gentry, capable of transforming and corroding anything from the laws of physics to even beings as powerful as Monitors, turning its victims into gruesome and evil creatures who are incapable of dying.

In DCU continuity the Equation itself retains its importance to a great many interested parties having come into the control of a host of users both in incomplete and whole formulations of itself. It is first possessed by the evil Old God Yuga Khan who uses it to resurrect many of his fallen brethren in a final battle against his sons Uxas and Izaya before falling in battle. Eventually many an individual would come to possess either finite understanding or complete utilization of the Anti-Life Equation for their own personal use over time. Some eons later Darkseid would use a fraction of its nightmarish will-sapping power in his invasion cycles of the Earth 2 parallel universe; soon it was revealed that others possessed the full Equation but lacked the incentive to use it. The formula itself however is revealed to be a sentient being able to express itself to its current hosts.

It was revealed that the Anti-Life Equation was the source of the Anti-Matter Universe's creation, and that the Anti-Monitor used to be a Qwardian scientist in the Anti-Matter Universe named Mobius who was the first to find and touch the Anti-Life Equation; it then fused with him and transformed him into the Anti-Monitor, the Anti-Life Equation's living embodiment. When Darkseid died in the battle against him and his daughter Grail, Mobius forfeited the equation to return to his original form. The power itself which possessed him is now in the hands of his original benefactor, establishing her as the Goddess of Anti-Life.

Interpretations of the Equation

Over the years, the Anti-Life Equation has changed as various writers have offered their own definitions of the concept.

In Jack Kirby's original version, the Equation manifests itself as the power to control any sentient minds through direct commands. A clear distinction was made between the Anti-Life Equation and other methods of control like manipulation or hypnosis. While Darkseid could already exert some control over humanity through the preachings of his minion Glorious Godfrey, possessing the Equation would allow unlimited and instantaneous control.

In Jim Starlin's mini-series Cosmic Odyssey, the Anti-Life Equation is revealed as a living shadow-based deity that corrupts and destroys everything it touches. This revelation shocks even Darkseid, who teams up with the New Gods and a group of superheroes from Earth to stop the Anti-Life Equation entity, ultimately sealing it off from their reality. The Anti-Life Equation Entity would be retconned as a creature who had been mislabeled as far as having anything to do with the Anti-Life Equation.

In Issue #4 of Neil Gaiman's Sandman series, the demon Choronzon mimics the form of 'Anti-Life' when challenging Dream to 'the Oldest Game' - a battle of wits in which the two must define increasingly powerful entities in turn. Attempting to end the game, Choronzon states "I am Anti-Life, the beast of judgement. I am the dark at the end of everything. The end of universes, gods, worlds...of everything", at which point he takes on the appearance of a large, blank face against a white background. Dream counters this by proclaiming "I am hope".

In Walt Simonson's Orion series, the Equation is portrayed much like in the original Kirby comics, ignoring the version shown in Cosmic Odyssey. Besides the power to control minds, it is also shown to give its wielder the power to revive corpses through verbal commands.

In the 2005 Seven Soldiers: Mister Miracle mini-series, written by Grant Morrison, Darkseid (or Boss Dark Side, as he was calling himself) gained control of the Anti-Life Equation, which is stylized in narration as:

loneliness + alienation + fear + despair + self-worth ÷ mockery ÷ condemnation ÷ misunderstanding × guilt × shame × failure × judgment n=y where y=hope and n=folly, love=lies, life=death, self=dark side

By speaking said equation, Darkseid can insert the full formula into people's minds, giving them the mathematical certainty that life, hope and freedom are all pointless. According to Oracle, who barely escaped the "full" effects of the Equation by shutting down the entire Internet just in time, the Anti-Life Equation further states that the only point in anything is to conform to Darkseid's will. Shilo Norman (the current Mister Miracle) is able to break free from this with the help of Metron, gaining immunity from the Equation in the process. He passes this immunity to his allies by drawing a specific pattern (the pattern is shown to be the New Genesis word for freedom) on their face.

When Jim Starlin returned to writing the New Gods in 2007's Death of the New Gods mini-series, the retcon was revised, with the Anti-Life Equation Entity being revealed to be one-half of a cosmic being that was split into two by the war of the old gods (the other half of the cosmic entity being the Source). In a text page published in Final Crisis Secret Files, Grant Morrison attempts to reconcile the Starlin version of the Anti-Life Equation with his own version, by suggesting that the Equation is indeed sentient (as Starlin suggests) and that even after "mastering" the Equation, Darkseid still does not understand the true horrific nature of what the Anti-Life Equation is and its relationship with the Source.

In the New 52 the Anti-Life has much of the same powers it had before, Yuga Khan having used it to bring back the dead Old Gods to aid him in battle against his sons, Dreamer Beautiful using it for the first time to resurrect a deceased Mark Moonrider, and Darkseid himself using a fraction of it to draw unsuspecting victims to their end by broadcasting it over his parademon hive factories.

Life Equation
The Anti-Life's opposite member takes more prominence within the New 52. The white Light of Life is said to be the spark that originally gave birth to the positive matter universe of Earth-Zero just as the Anti-Life gave rise to the antimatter universe. Unlike the Anti-Life Equation which saps a person of their free will, The Life Equation is an all consuming power which has the capability to restructure reality by changing its formula around rewriting the very multiverse itself, representing the attributes of life itself pertaining to change and variance. The make up of the equation formula seems to vary from iteration to iteration. One instance relates it to the Emotional Spectrum and its corresponding seven lights:

rage, greed, fear, will, hope, compassion and love.

Initially believing all of these refractions of the source light to lead in becoming the Life Equation, it is then realized that the formula itself is a separate power all its own connected directly to The Source of all things. Its power once hidden behind the wall of its namesake had been removed and supplanted within the White Ring utilized by Kyle Rayner to escape it after the seven emotional entities gave themselves to both him and it to replenish the Emotional Reservoir. It is later revealed that Kyle managed to escape with the equation in hand after he reached out into the source itself and unknowingly claimed the equation. Once claimed the Life Equation has the power to redefine reality on a universal to multiversal degree enabling the user to change the formula to remake all of existence. In another manifestation, the formula reads as a direct contradiction to that of the Anti-Life Equation presenting as follows:
 
companionship + understanding + assurance + joy + altruism ÷ respect ÷ commendation ÷ sympathy × innocence × dignity × success × acceptance y=n where y=despair and n=caution, love=truth, death=rebirth, and self=light side

For reality embodies life and the equation is the tangible abstract of how it is defined, also similarly to Anti-Life; the Life variant can subjugate life to follow the user in the creation of a new world order in favor of protection of life, rather than accepting it as meaninglessness. The Life Equation was split into seven parts and placed into Kyle's and six newly created White Power rings. These seven rings can be brought together to restore the Life Equation if needed but until that time the White Lantern Corps can protect the equation.

Alternate realities
 In the Elseworlds graphic novel Superman: The Dark Side (1998) Darkseid raises Kal-El as his own (evil) son and later finds that Krypton had been in possession of the Anti-Life Equation before it was destroyed and Jor-El had sent it with his son so that he could use it to subjugate Earth and create a new Krypton. Naturally Darkseid finds it and builds a series of towers which broadcast "...the ANTI-LIFE EQUATION which obliterates free will and individual identity".
 In the World's Funnest Elseworlds one-shot (2001), created by Evan Dorkin and a variety of artists, a conflict between Bat-Mite and Mister Mxyzptlk inadvertently destroys the DCU (including many pre-crisis worlds). When they destroy Apokolips the sole survivor is Darkseid who is left floating in space with a piece of paper with the equation drawn on it; the paper has a diagram to the effect of "Mister Mxyzptlk + Bat-Mite = Anti-life". This causes Darkseid to die laughing.
 In the DCeased written by Tom Taylor, Darkseid has captured Cyborg, who possesses one half of the Anti-Life Equation. With the other half already in his possession, Darkseid attempts to mix the two halves together, but DeSaad warns him that if Cyborg dies, the Equation will cease to exist. Darkseid thus summons the Black Racer to control Cyborg's life and activates the Equation. However, Black Racer's connection tampers the Anti-Life Equation and makes it autonomous. This causes Darkseid to lose control to the now tainted Equation, and in his despair he destroys Apokolips. DeSaad manages to teleport Cyborg away beforehand, but as soon as Cyborg appears on Earth, the Equation breaches the Global Internet and infects the world via mobile devices connected to it.

In other media

DC Animated Universe
 In Superman: The Animated Series episode "Apokolips... Now!, Part 1", Orion arrives to Earth and uses his Mother Box, to explain to Superman about Apokolips, and its ruler, Darkseid. During its explanation, Mother Box spoke of how Darkseid was after the Anti-Life Equation, which was said to give him great power.
 In the Justice League episode "Twilight", Darkseid hacks into the systems of Brainiac, with potentially catastrophic results. As he explains to the captured Superman, this will give him the solution to the Anti-Life Equation, allowing him to destroy the universe and rebuild it - this time in his own image.
 In Justice League Unlimited'''s final episode, "Destroyer", during an assault on Earth by Darkseid and the armies of Apokolips, Lex Luthor is taken into The Source by Metron. Just as Darkseid ensnares Superman in a powerful, agony-inducing net, Lex Luthor returns from The Source and reveals the Anti-Life Equation, shown as a glowing, swirling light in the palm of his hand, to Darkseid. Darkseid places a hand over the glow, Lex places a hand on Darkseid's hand, both agreeing the equation "is beautiful", and they both disappear. It is not known what happened to either Lex Luthor or Darkseid. Superman believes that they both died, but both Batman and Green Lantern doubt it, believing instead that they will both be back. According to Dwayne McDuffie, upon learning the Anti-Life Equation, both Lex Luthor and Darkseid became part of the Source Wall.

 Smallville 
 The Anti-Life Equation is briefly featured in the Smallville season 8 episode "Legion". During the episode, Brainiac attempts to capture the knowledge of others through a computer virus; the voice echoing through the computer states "Hate plus fear plus loneliness...".
 During season 9 episode "Roulette", the Anti-Life Equation was briefly referenced by Clark Kent.
 The Anti-Life Equation's Omega symbol appears in the tenth and final season of Smallville. It serves as a sign when a being is influenced by Darkseid. Notable people are Orion, Slade Wilson in the episode "Patriot", and Oliver Queen in "Masquerade", and then reversed in "Finale, part 2".

Other
 In Abraxas, Guardian of the Universe, a Canadian science-fiction film from 1991, the Anti-Life Equation has a prominent role.
 In Teen Titans Go!, Darkseid mentions the Anti-Life Equation, but he is criticized as being a "math nerd" by Beast Boy.
 In the DC Super Hero Girls episode "My So Called Anti-Life", Darkseid, posing as a human math teacher named Dr. Seid, tricks the Super Hero Girls into solving the Anti-Life Equation for him by putting it on a test. With the completed equation, Darkseid begins transforming Earth's population into duplicates of himself. Batgirl, Harley Quinn, Bumblebee, and Raven manage to reverse the effects by reminding the people of who they really are, which they refer to as "introducing new variables to the equation to change the answer".
 In the video game Injustice 2, the Anti-Life Equation is mentioned in pre-battle dialogue between Darkseid and Wonder Woman. Darkseid asks what primitive weapon she is wielding and she claims to be the Anti-Life Equation. Darkseid states that she has revealed her true form, implying Wonder Woman has been corrupted by the Anti-Life Equation.
 In Lego DC Super-Villains, Darkseid is after the Anti-Life Equation. He sends the Crime Syndicate to replace the Justice League to find the Equation on Earth. Towards the end of the game, the Rookie would then absorb the equation and use it to change Darkseid and his army.
 During the Justice League Action episode "It'll Take a Miracle", Mr. Miracle is revealed to be in possession of a piece to Darkseid's Anti-Life Equation machine. Darkseid's plan was to erase all sentient thought in the universe with the device and enslave everyone, but Batman was able to destroy the machine when he replaced the missing component with one of Miracle's light show props. 
 In the third season of Young Justice, the phrase "Prepare The Anti Life Equation" can be spelt out from the first letter of each episode title. In the episode "Influence", an experimental Anti-Life equation is used by Granny Goodness against Superman, Wonder Woman, and Hawkwoman, as well as the Female Furies they are fighting. Superman later manages to stop Granny Goodness from using the equation on them. In "Unknown Factors", after an encounter with Halo (who contains the spirit of a Mother Box), Goodness theorizes that she can access the Anti-Life Equation, and contacts Darkseid after the encounter to let him know she has found it. In "Antisocial Pathologies", Halo is taken by Granny into the X-Pit, a space that is the access point to what is called the ghost dimension, allowing her to decipher the equation into being. Granny then tests it on Helga Jace, who retains her emotions but loses her free will, and thus follows Granny's orders. Thus, Granny confirms the revelation that the ghost dimension and Halo's powers are a form of the equation: ghost dimension + Halo = Anti-Life. Despite interference from the Light via Geo-Force and Terra, Granny is able to escape with Halo. In "Terminus", after a majority of the Justice League and the Team attempt to raid Granny's space station base, she succeeds in using the equation to enslave them all before spreading the equation's influence throughout the universe to place it under Apokolips rule, beginning the Age of Darkseid. In "Into the Breach", she would have succeeded, had Victor Stone not come to her base when he did and allowed the heroes to stop her by freeing Halo. By the season finale, Darkseid's quest to find the Anti-Life Equation supposedly continues elsewhere in the universe, while Vandal Savage and the Light keep an eye on Halo for their future plans.
 In the Supergirl episode "The Bottle Episode", one of Brainiac 5's doppelgangers uses the Anti-Life Equation to murder another version of himself.
 In Zack Snyder's Justice League, Darkseid discovers that the Anti-Life Equation is carved on the surface of Earth. After being fought back by the defenders of Earth, the location of the Equation is lost. Later Steppenwolf rediscovers the Equation and informs Darkseid, promising to complete the conquest of Earth so that Darkseid may claim the Equation. After Steppenwolf is defeated by the Justice League, Darkseid states that he will use "the old ways" to claim the Equation, and assembles his military forces for an invasion.
 In The Sandman'' episode "A Hope in Hell", Lucifer Morningstar invokes Anti-Life in-response to Dream invoking of a universe in an attempt to win their duel, only to be defeated once Matthew the Raven unwittingly inspires Dream to invoke hope, defeating and publicly humiliating Lucifer in front of their kingdom.

See also
Hypertime

References

Equations
DC Comics deities